Istros the Callimachean was a Greek writer, probably from Paphos.  He was a pupil of Callimachus, and active in the Library of Alexandria.  Seventy-seven fragments of his writings remain, mostly from his four-volume Attica, which discussed the cult, religion, and institutions of Attica in its mythical past, based largely on Atthides.  According to the Suda, a 10th-century encyclopedia, he wrote both prose and verse.

Works 
Istros' works exist only in fragments (FGrHist 334). Among his attested works are:
 Attika (Ἀττικά)
 Atakta (Ἄτακτα)
 Attikai lexeis (Ἀττικαὶ λέξεις)
 Argolika (Ἀργολικά)
 Eliaka (Ἠλιακά)
 The colonies of the Egyptians (Αἰγυπτίων ἀποικίαι)
 On the city of Ptolemais (Περὶ Πτολεμαΐδος)
 Collection of Cretan feasts (Συναγωγὴ τῶν Κρητικῶν θυσιῶν)
 On the struggles of Helios (Περὶ τῶν Ἡλίου ἀγώνων)
 The manifestations of Apollo (Ἀπόλλωνος ἐπιφάνειαι)
 The manifestations of Hercules (Ἡρακλέους ἐπιφάνειαι)
 On the lyric poets (Περὶ μελοποιῶν)
 Symmikta (Σύμμικτα), "Miscellany"
 Hypomnemata (Ὑπομνήματα), "Commentary"
 Replies to Timeus (Πρὸς Τίμαιον ἀντιγραφαί)

Notes

Further reading 
Monica Berti, Istro il Callimacheo, I, Testimonianze e frammenti su Atene e sull'Attica, Edizioni Tored, Tivoli (Roma) 2009

Other resources 
demo.fragmentarytexts.org - Istros
The Digital Fragmenta Historicorum Graecorum (DFHG)
The Digital Athenaeus

Ancient Greek writers
Librarians of Alexandria
Year of death unknown
Year of birth unknown